Anakoderu is a village in West Godavari district in the state of Andhra Pradesh in India. Bhimavaram town and junction stations are the nearest railway stations.

Demographics
 India census, Anakoderu has a population of 5697 of which 2877 are males while 2820 are females. The average sex ratio of Anakoderu village is 980. The child population is 571, which makes up 10.02% of the total population of the village, with sex ratio 1025. In 2011, the literacy rate of Anakoderu village was 72.20% when compared to 67.02% of Andhra Pradesh.

See also 
 Eluru

References 

Villages in West Godavari district